A. Murat Eren (Meren) is computer scientist known for his work on microbial ecology and developing novel, open-source, computational tools for analysis of large data sets.

Early life and education 
Eren grew up in the Barhal Valley in Turkey and studied cryptography as an undergraduate at Canakkale Onsekiz Mart Universitesi where he earned a B.S. in 2002. He moved to the United States and started his Ph.D. at the University of New Orleans. While working at the Children's Hospital of New Orleans, Eren was introduced to microbiology by Michael Ferris. In 2011 Eren completed his Ph.D. that was titled "Assessing microbial diversity through nucleotide variation".

Career and research 
Eren's Ph.D. research involved developing oligotyping, a computational method to examine the diversity of microorganisms within high throughput sequencing datasets. Following his Ph.D., Eren joined the Marine Biological Laboratory as a postdoctoral scientist, during which he applied oligotyping to microbes that live in the human genitourinary tract, oral cavity, and sewage. In 2015 he joined the University of Chicago as an Assistant Professor, where he started using metagenomics to investigate the ecology and evolution of microbes found in the human gut, human mouth, and surface ocean. In 2022, Eren has been appointed as Professor of Ecosystem Data Science at the University of Oldenburg, and the Alfred Wegener Institute for Polar and Marine Research.

Eren is an advocate of open-source software and leads the community development of anvi'o, a platform to allow analysis and visualization of large datasets.

Selected publications

Awards and honors 

 Alfred P. Sloan Foundation Research Fellowship in Ocean Sciences (2020)
 American Society for Microbiology Award for Early Career Environmental Research (2020)

References

External links 

 

University of Chicago faculty
University of New Orleans alumni
Çanakkale Onsekiz Mart University alumni
Living people
Computer scientists
Ecologists
Free software programmers
1980 births